Bingletts Wood is a  biological Site of Special Scientific Interest east of Heathfield in East Sussex.

Part of this ancient wood is a steep sided valley which has a warm and moist microclimate and it is rich in mosses and liverworts. A woodland glade has two ponds which support white water lily and several species of pondweed.

The site is private land with no public access.

References

Sites of Special Scientific Interest in East Sussex